Driven by Fate is a 1915 American silent short drama film directed by John G. Adolfi and starring William Garwood and Violet Mersereau. The film also stars Florence Crawford, Tammany Young and Conrad Cantzen.

External links

1915 films
1915 drama films
Silent American drama films
American silent short films
American black-and-white films
1915 short films
1910s American films